

 
Davenport is a locality in the Northern Territory of Australia located about  south of the territory capital of Darwin.

The locality consists of the following land (from west to east):  
The Singleton and Neutral Junction pastoral leases, 
The Kurundi and Murray Downs pastoral leases, and the Mungkarta Aboriginal Lands Trust,
The Epenarra pastoral lease, the Warumungu and Anurrete Aboriginal Lands Trusts and the Elkedra pastoral lease.
The locality fully surrounds the communities of Ali Curung, Tara and Wutungurra.

The locality's boundaries and name were gazetted on 4 April 2007.  Its name is derived from the mountain range which was named in 1860 by John McDouall Stuart as the Davenport Range after Samuel Davenport, a South Australian politician.

Davenport includes the following places that have been listed on the Northern Territory Heritage Register – the Barrow Creek Hotel, the Barrow Creek Telegraph Station and the Neutral Junction Homestead (Old).

The 2016 Australian census which was conducted in August 2016 reports that Davenport had 178 people living within its boundaries of which 59.4% were male, 40.6% were female and 59.3% who identified as “Aboriginal and/or Torres Strait Islander people.”

Davenport is located within the federal division of Lingiari, the territory electoral division of Barkly and the local government area of the Barkly Region.

References

Notes

Citations

Populated places in the Northern Territory
Barkly Region